Should a Girl Propose? is a 1925 Australian silent film directed by P. J. Ramster set in the high society world of Sydney. The film featured several players from Ramster's acting school.

It is considered a lost film.

Cast
Cecil Pawley as Ellis Swift
Thelma Newling as Esma
Rex Simpson
Joy Wood
Norma Wood

Reception
The film critic from the Sydney Morning Herald stated that:
To say that it is among the best of the Australian pictures presented within the last year or two is, unfortunately, not recommending it very highly. Providing one sees it in a good-humoured-frame of mind, there is mild entertainment, in it. One particularly satisfactory feature is the acting...

References

External links

Should a Girl Propose? at National Film and Sound Archive

1926 films
Australian drama films
Australian silent feature films
Australian black-and-white films
1926 drama films
Lost Australian films
Silent drama films